Thakin Ba Thein Tin (1914–1995) was a Burmese communist and the chairman of Communist Party of Burma (CPB) from 1975 to 1989.

Born in Tavoy, his father was a Chinese petty trader, his mother was a Burmese. In 1931, he passed the matriculation exam and attended Rangoon University. However, he was unable to further his studies because his debt-ridden father could not afford university fees.

Ba Thein Tin became a worker for the Dohbama Asiayone in 1938, and joint the CPB in the next year, he was one of the earliest CPB members. As the district party committee organizer in Tavoy, he fought against Japanese in 1945. He became a politburo member of CPB in the next year. In March 1948, he went underground with Thakin Than Tun. He was selected the vice chairman in 1950. In 1953, he left for China and resided there. Since mid-1960s he became the de facto leader of CPB. However, he did not return from China until 1978.

In April 1989, a group of CPB mutineers raided the party headquarters in the border town of Panghsang. Ba Thein Tin and many senior party members were deported to China. He died in Changsha, Hunan, in 1995.

See also
 Communist insurgency in Myanmar

References

1914 births
1995 deaths
Communist Party of Burma politicians
People from Tanintharyi Region
University of Yangon alumni
Burmese people of Chinese descent